Hoplojana zernyi is a moth in the family Eupterotidae. It was described by Robert Gschwandner in 1923. It is found in Tanzania.

Physical attributes
The species has a wingspan of 152 mm.

Etymology
It is named for the entomologist Dr. Hans Anton Zerny.

References

Moths described in 1923
Janinae